Sadath Ali Khan was an Indian political and member of first and second Lok Sabha. He represented Warangal parliamentary constituency from 1952 to 1962. A member of the Indian National Congress, he also served as a secretary to the government of India from 1953 to 57.

He later served as the Indian Ambassador to Iraq (1962-1965) and Turkey.

Biography 
He was born to Nawab Zain Yar Jung on 16 September 1916 in Hyderabad, India. He received his education from Nizam College, Hyderabad and later received further studies from the Oxford University. As a writer and journalist, he wrote poems in Urdu and English, and translated some uncertain literary works of English into Urdu.

He was married to Sakina Begum, with whom he had one son.

References 

1919 births
Year of death unknown
India MPs 1952–1957
India MPs 1957–1962
Indian National Congress politicians
Lok Sabha members from Andhra Pradesh
Osmania University alumni
Ambassadors of India to Iraq
Ambassadors of India to Turkey
Indian expatriates in the United Kingdom